Dubai World Cup Night is a series of eight thoroughbred horse races and one Purebred Arabian race held annually at Meydan Racecourse in Dubai, United Arab Emirates. From 1996 through to 2009, the event was held at the Nad Al Sheba Racecourse.

Run under the auspices of the Emirates Racing Authority, the event currently offers purses totalling US$27.25 million and is the single richest day of Thoroughbred racing in the world. The Dubai World Cup Night includes the following races:

 Dubai Kahayla Classic GI (for purebred Arabians)
 Al Quoz Sprint GI
 Godolphin Mile GII
 Dubai Gold Cup GII
 UAE Derby GII
 Dubai Golden Shaheen GI (part of the Global Sprint Challenge since 2012)
 Dubai Turf GI (was part of the Asian Mile Challenge)
 Dubai Sheema Classic GI
 Dubai World Cup GI (The World's Richest Horse Race at USD $12 Million)

References
 Meydan Racecourse
 ESPN report on the 2008 Dubai World Cup Night

 
Horse races in the United Arab Emirates
Sports competitions in Dubai
Horse racing meetings